Tropical Storm Ophelia may refer to:

In the Atlantic Ocean:
 Hurricane Ophelia (2005), a slow-moving hurricane that battered the coast of North Carolina.
 Hurricane Ophelia (2011), a powerful Category 4 hurricane that affected Bermuda and Newfoundland (as a post-tropical storm).
 Hurricane Ophelia (2017), a Category 3 hurricane that affected the Azores; after transitioning to an extratropical cyclone, it struck Ireland, Great Britain and Norway.

In the Western Pacific Ocean:
 Tropical Storm Ophelia (1948) (T4805) 
 Typhoon Ophelia (1953), (T5308), a Category 3 storm 
 Typhoon Ophelia (1958) (T5801), a Category 5 storm
 Typhoon Ophelia, a long-lived Category 4 storm in 1960 that devastated the atoll of Ulithi

In the Southwest Pacific Ocean:
 Cyclone Ophelia (1986)
 Tropical Cyclone Ophelia (1996)
 Tropical Cyclone Ophelia (2008)

Atlantic hurricane set index articles
Pacific typhoon set index articles
Australian region cyclone set index articles